The Canadian International Tag Team Championship was the tag team title in the Montreal-based wrestling promotion Lutte Internationale (International Wrestling). The title lasted from 1976 until Lutte Internationale closed in 1987.

Title history

External links
Canadian International Tag Team title history

Tag team wrestling championships
Canadian professional wrestling championships
Sport in Montreal